"Music's Too Sad Without You" is a song recorded by Australian singer Kylie Minogue and English singer Jack Savoretti. It was released for contemporary hit radio on 13 October 2018 through BMG as the fifth single from Minogue's fourteenth studio album, Golden (2018). The song was written by Minogue, Savoretti and its producer Samuel Dixon. "Music's Too Sad Without You" has been described as a country-tinged ballad. Savoretti included a live performance of the song on the deluxe edition of his sixth studio album, Singing to Strangers (2019), and included the original version on the special edition of that album.

Background and composition
"Music's Too Sad Without You" was written by Minogue, Savoretti and Samuel Dixon, whilst produced by Dixon. In October 2018, Minogue and Savoretti both teased at the song's music video, posting stills on social media. A day later, Minogue announced the song as the fifth and final single from Golden, with the radio edit of the song premiering on 13 October 2018 on BBC Radio 2. The song has been described as a country-tinged ballad.

Music video
The music video for the song, directed by Joe Connor, was filmed in the Teatro La Fenice opera house in Venice, Italy. It premiered on YouTube on 15 October 2018 and has been viewed over 2.3 million times.

Live performances
"Music's Too Sad Without You" was included on the set list for the Kylie Presents: Golden shows, with both Minogue and Savoretti performing the song. The song was also performed as part of the Venice Jazz Festival in July 2018. On 10 November 2018, Minogue and Savoretti performed the song on The Jonathan Ross Show. On 24 November 2018, they performed the song on Michael McIntyre's Big Show.

Charts

Release history

References

2018 singles
2018 songs
2010s ballads
Jack Savoretti songs
Kylie Minogue songs
Songs about heartache
Songs written by Kylie Minogue
Songs written by Samuel Dixon
Songs written by Jack Savoretti
Country ballads